Alice Cares is a 2015 Dutch film directed by Sander Burger. It is a documentary film that explores how a new robot technology may be able to aid many senior citizens in the developing western world. The film premiered at the Vancouver International Film Festival in Vancouver, B.C. on 27 September 2015.

References

External links 
 

Dutch documentary films
Documentary films about robots
Documentary films about old age